Holy Trinity Chapel of New York University was NYU's former Generoso Pope Catholic Center and Catholic chapel, located at 58 Washington Square South, West Village, Manhattan, New York. It was built 1961–1964 and was a prominent example of the Brutalist architectural style, executed in reinforced concrete and modernist stained glass. It was designed by the noted American architectural firm of Eggers & Higgins.

The chapel occupied highly desirable land on Washington Square, and a decision was made to close the chapel and redirect Catholic Center services to a nearby parish, the Church of St. Joseph on Sixth Avenue at Washington Place. It was briefly rented to Washington Square Methodist Episcopal Church when that congregation left its 1860 church in 2004 and before the community joined with 2 others elsewhere as The Church of the Village. 

The New York Times reported that it was sold in early 2009 for $25 million for redevelopment to the university. "The fate of the chapel has created little stir, perhaps because many residents aren't very fond of its looks. Built in the 1960s, the chapel incorporates elements of Brutalist architecture, known for its liberal use of concrete.... 'It’s not terribly pleasing to the eye,' said Brad Hoylman, chairman of Community Board 2, which includes Washington Square Park. He added, however, that there was at least some anxiety about what may replace it."

The AIA Guide to NYC (2010) described the chapel as "awkward Modernism from a time when the search for form preoccupied American architects." The building was demolished in 2009.

References 

Roman Catholic churches completed in 1964
20th-century Roman Catholic church buildings in the United States
Eggers & Higgins church buildings
Brutalist architecture in New York City
Modernist architecture in New York City
Roman Catholic churches in Manhattan
Closed churches in the Roman Catholic Archdiocese of New York
Closed churches in New York City
Demolished churches in New York City
Demolished buildings and structures in Manhattan
New York University
West Village
1964 establishments in New York City
2009 disestablishments in New York (state)
Buildings and structures demolished in 2009